Jeremy Russell Gelbwaks (born May 22, 1961, in Los Angeles) is an American former child actor who starred in the television series The Partridge Family (1970–71).

Career 

Gelbwaks was the first actor to play the role of Chris Partridge.  He left the series after the first season, and was replaced by Brian Forster in the summer of 1971.  According to his Partridge Family castmate David Cassidy, Gelbwaks "had a personality conflict with every person in the cast, and with the producers". In a 2005 interview with the Television Academy Foundation, Shirley Jones mentioned that Gelbwaks "was not happy doing [the show] .. his parents wanted him to do it, so we replaced him".

He stopped acting when his family moved to Reston, Virginia, a suburb of Washington, D.C., where they remained for a year and a half before moving again to Connecticut, and later to Potsdam, New York. Gelbwaks graduated from Hermon Dekalb Central School (Hermon, NY) in 1978 and was a member of the National Honor Society.  His father Norman taught computer science at the State University of New York at Potsdam.

Gelbwaks graduated from college in 1982, and became a computer analyst while studying chemistry at UC Berkeley. He worked in the computer industry until 1999, studied business at Columbia University, and became a management consultant. He married Patricia Polander, and moved to New Orleans, where he works as a business and technology planner.

References

External links

1961 births
Living people
Male actors from Los Angeles
American male child actors
Columbia Business School alumni
UC Berkeley College of Letters and Science alumni
American male telenovela actors
20th-century American male actors